Samuel Tolfrey (died 3 January 1827) was the 4th Civil Auditor General of British Ceylon. 

Tolfrey and his family went out to Calcutta around 1800 and from there to Ceylon in 1801, where he was initially appointed to the Board of Revenue.

He was appointed Civil Auditor General on 1 October 1806, succeeding Robert Boyd, and held the office until his retirement on 14 June 1809. He was succeeded by R. Plasket. 

He compiled a Sinhalese dictionary. After retirement he returned to England and died in London in 1825. He had married Mary Barboud. He had several sons, including Edward who remained in Ceylon and a daughter Mary, who married Dr. Thomas Christie, the Superintendent-General of Hospitals in Ceylon.

References

Auditors General of Sri Lanka
1750s births
1827 deaths
Year of birth uncertain
British colonial governors and administrators in Asia